So Late So Soon is a 2020 American documentary film directed by Daniel Hymanson in his debut. It is a portrait of Chicago artists Jackie and Don Seiden in their later years as health issues jeopardize their life together in a multicolored Victorian house, which had become a work of art in itself over the course of their 50-year marriage – as well as an icon in Chicago's Rogers Park neighborhood. Though primarily observational in form, the film includes several moments of interaction with Hymanson as well as scenes that draw on archival footage, some of which the Seidens recorded themselves. Hymanson first met Jackie Seiden as a child, enrolling in her classes at the School of the Art Institute of Chicago. Don Seiden also taught at the Art Institute and founded its art therapy program.

The film's production took place off and on over five years and received support from the Sundance Institute, Kartemquin Labs, the Illinois Arts Council, and IFP.

Reception
The film premiered at the True/False Film Fest in 2020 and went on to screen at DOC NYC, BAFICI, Big Sky, Indie Memphis, Ashland, and the Calgary Underground Film Festival, where it received a Special Jury Prize for Documentary Filmmaking. Oscilloscope acquired the film’s worldwide rights before distributing it theatrically in the United States.

Across its festival run and theatrical release, the film met with a favorable response in outlets such as Filmmaker, The Hollywood Reporter, The Capital Times, Paste, Senses of Cinema, RogerEbert.com, Vox, and VOX Magazine. Critics have commended the film for the intimacy it achieves with its protagonists and for an associative narrative structure, evocative of how memory and emotion operate.

IndieWire selected the film as a Critic's Pick and the IDA Awards shortlisted it for Best Feature in 2021.

References

External links 
 

2020 films
2020 directorial debut films
2020 documentary films
2020s American films
2020s English-language films
American documentary films
Documentary films about visual artists
Films about marriage
Films about educators
Documentary films about Chicago
Films shot in Chicago